Aclytia mictochroa is a moth of the family Erebidae. It was described by George Hampson in 1914. It is found in Brazil.

References

Moths described in 1914
Aclytia
Moths of South America